Air Marshal Sir Harry Burton  (2 May 1919 – 29 November 1994) was a Royal Air Force officer who became Air-Officer-Commanding-in-Chief of RAF Air Support Command.

RAF career
Born in Rutherglen (Lanarkshire), Scotland and educated at the High School of Glasgow, Burton joined the Royal Air Force in 1937. During the Second World War he served as a pilot with No. 215 Squadron and then No. 149 Squadron before being shot down over the Black Forest and taken prisoner of war. He escaped from Stalag Luft I (Barth, Germany), making his way to neutral Sweden before being returned to Scotland, and is believed to be the first British POW escapee of WWII to have successfully made it back home; later in the war he was appointed Officer Commanding No. 242 Squadron and then No. 238 Squadron.

After the war he was seconded to the Indian Air Force before becoming Group Captain responsible for Organisation at Headquarters RAF Bomber Command in 1958 and then Station Commander at RAF Scampton in 1960. Having been deputy commander of a display squadron for the 1962 Commonwealth Games in Perth, Australia, he was made Senior Air Staff Officer at Headquarters No. 3 Group in 1963, Air Executive to the Deputy for Nuclear Affairs at Supreme Headquarters Allied Powers Europe in 1965 and Air Officer Commanding No. 23 (Training) Group in 1967. He went on to be Air-Officer-Commanding-in-Chief of RAF Air Support Command in 1970, in which capacity he opened the now disbanded Southend Aircraft Museum, and Air Officer Commanding No. 46 Group and received his knighthood in 1971 before retiring in 1973.

References

|-

1919 births
1994 deaths
People from Rutherglen
People educated at the High School of Glasgow
Commanders of the Order of the British Empire
Companions of the Distinguished Service Order
Knights Commander of the Order of the Bath
Royal Air Force air marshals
Royal Air Force personnel of World War II
World War II prisoners of war held by Germany
British World War II prisoners of war
Shot-down aviators
British escapees
Scottish airmen